The 8th Armoured Division was an armoured division of the British Army during the Second World War. It was deployed to Egypt in June 1942 but never operated as a complete formation and was disbanded in January the following year.

History

The division was sent to North Africa but never saw active service as a complete formation. As the division could not be provided with a lorried infantry brigade, it was broken up and was finally disbanded in Egypt on 1 January 1943.

Following the Second Battle of El Alamein a plan was put forth to use the remains of the division as a self-contained pursuit force to dart forward into the German-Italian rear as far as possibly Tobruk, however the plan to use the division was shelved and units in the forward area were used instead. Afterwards, the name of the division was used for the purpose of military deception.

Order of Battle 
The units which formed part of the division included (day/month/year).  Worth to note, in the six months the division was in Egypt, it never operated as a complete formation.  Order of battle was:

 8th Armoured Division Headquarters
 8th Armoured Division Signals, Royal Corps of Signals 4/11/40–16/12/42
 2nd Derbyshire Yeomanry 27/11/40–20/8/42
 23rd Armoured Brigade 22/11/40–11/7/42
 23rd Armoured Brigade Headquarters
 23rd Armoured Brigade Signal Troop, Royal Signals
 40th (The King's) Royal Tank Regiment
 46th (Liverpool Welsh) Royal Tank Regiment
 50th Royal Tank Regiment
 1st Battalion, The London Rifle Brigade later 7th Battalion, The Prince Consort's Own (Rifle Brigade) (London Rifle Brigade)
 24th Armoured Brigade 22/11/40–10/10/42 then 31/10/42–6/11/42
 23rd Armoured Brigade Headquarters
 23rd Armoured Brigade Signal Troop, Royal Signals
 41st (Oldham) Royal Tank Regiment
 45th (Leeds Rifles) Royal Tank Regiment
 47th (Oldham) Royal Tank Regiment
 1st Battalion, The Queen's Westminsters later 11th (Queen's Westminsters) Battalion, The King's Royal Rifle Corps
 8th Support Group 7/11/40–23/7/42
 8th Support Group Headquarters Detachment
 14th Battalion, The Derbyshire and Nottinghamshire Regiment (Sherwood Foresters)
 5th Regiment, Royal Horse Artillery (Field) 19/9/42–11/11/42
 73rd Anti-Tank Regiment, Royal Artillery 25/9/42–26/10/42 (part of Hammerforce, see above)
 56th (East Lancashire) Light Anti-Aircraft Regiment, Royal Artillery 23/7/42–6/11/42 (part of Hammerforce, see above)
 CRA, 8th Armoured as HQ Hammerforce from 18/10/42–3/11/42 (see below for units)
 Commander Royal Artillery, 8th Armoured Division (HQ Hammerforce, see above)
 HQ Commander Royal Artillery
 CRA Signal Troop, Royal Signals
 5th Regiment, Royal Horse Artillery (Field) 19/9/42–11/11/42
 11th (Honourable Artillery Company) Regiment, Royal Horse Artillery (Field) 12/8/42–20/8/42
 104th (Essex Yeomanry) Regiment, Royal Horse Artillery (Field) 13/9/42–26/9/42 (part of Hammerforce, see above)
 146th (Pembrokeshire and Cardiganshire) Field Regiment, Royal Artillery 19/9/42–6/11/42 (part of Hammerforce, see above)
 73rd Anti-Tank Regiment, Royal Artillery 25/9/42–26/10/42 (part of Hammerforce, see above)
 56th (East Lancashire) Light Anti-Aircraft Regiment, Royal Artillery 23/7/42–6/11/42 (part of Hammerforce, see above)
 CRA Medical Section, Royal Army Medical Corps
 Commander Royal Engineers, 8th Armoured Division
 HQ Divisional Engineers
 Divisional Engineers Signal Troop, Royal Signals
 6 Field Squadron, Royal Engineers 27/11/40–9/11/42
 9 Field Squadron, Royal Engineers 15/1/41–11/7/42 then 15/9/42–9/11/42
 145 Field Park Squadron, Royal Engineers 27/11/40–9/11/42
 Divisional Engineers 'B' Light Aid Detachment, Royal Army Ordnance Corps (from 43 Royal Electrical and Mechanical Engineers)
 8th Armoured Division Service Battalion, Royal Army Service Corps
 8th Armoured Division Maintenance Battalion, Royal Army Ordnance Corps (later Royal Electrical and Mechanical Engineers from 1943)
 8th Armoured Division Field Ambulance, Royal Army Medical Corps
 8th Armoured Division Military Police Company, Corps of Royal Military Police

Commanders 
Commanders of the brigade included:

 (Acting) Brigadier Arthur George Kenchington 4/11/40–14/12/40
 Major General Richard Loudon McCreery 14/11/40–15/10/41
 Major General Charles Wake Norman 15/10/41–24/8/42
 Major General Charles Henry Gairdner 24/8/42–1/1/43

See also

 List of British divisions in World War II
 British Armoured formations of World War II

Notes
 Footnotes

 Citations

References

External links 
 
 History

Armoured divisions of the British Army in World War II
British armoured divisions
Military units and formations established in 1940
Military units and formations disestablished in 1943
Military units and formations of the British Empire in World War II